Franz Wembacher (born 15 November 1958 in Bischofswiesen, Bavaria) was a West German luger who competed in the late 1970s and early 1980s. He won the gold medal in the men's doubles event at the 1984 Winter Olympics in Sarajevo.

Wembacher also won three bronze medals in the men's doubles event at the FIL World Luge Championships (1979, 1981, 1983). At the FIL European Luge Championships, he also won two medals in the men's doubles event with a silver in 1984 and a bronze in 1982.

Wembacher's best overall Luge World Cup finish was second in men's doubles in 1982-3.

His brother Anton Wembacher was also a luger.

References

 

 

1958 births
Living people
German male lugers
Lugers at the 1984 Winter Olympics
Olympic lugers of West Germany
Olympic gold medalists for West Germany
Olympic medalists in luge
Medalists at the 1984 Winter Olympics
People from Berchtesgadener Land
Sportspeople from Upper Bavaria